The 2019–20 Little Rock Trojans women's basketball team represented the University of Arkansas at Little Rock during the 2019–20 NCAA Division I women's basketball season. The Trojans, led by seventeenth year head coach Joe Foley, play their home games at the Jack Stephens Center and were members of the Sun Belt Conference. They finished the season 12–19, 9–9 in Sun Belt play to finish in a tie for fifth place with South Alabama. In the Sun Belt tournament, the Trojans, placed fifth, defeated No. 8 Appalachian State 48-47 before being defeated by No. 4 Louisiana 46–49. Shortly after being eliminated, the conference canceled the remainder of the tournament due to the COVID-19 pandemic which was followed with the NCAA canceling all post-season play.

Preseason

Sun Belt coaches poll
On October 30, 2019, the Sun Belt released their preseason coaches poll with the Trojans predicted to finish as champions of the conference.

Sun Belt Preseason All-Conference team

1st team

Kyra Collier – SR, Guard

2nd team

Tori Lasker – JR, Guard

Roster

Schedule

 
|-
!colspan=9 style=| Non-conference regular season

|-
!colspan=9 style=| Sun Belt Conference regular season

|-
!colspan=9 style=| Sun Belt Women's Tournament

See also
 2019–20 Little Rock Trojans men's basketball team

References

Little Rock Trojans women's basketball seasons
Little Rock